Austromerope is a genus of forcepfly which contains only two known species, Austromerope poultoni from Western Australia, and the South American Austromerope brasiliensis.  They are small scorpionflies, with large forceps-like structures at the tail and two pairs of wings. Only adults and eggs from captured adults are known - no larval stage has been seen. Much of the biology of these insects is not known, due to their secretiveness and rarity.

References

Mecoptera
Insects of Australia
Insects of South America